This is a list of active and extinct volcanoes.

See also
List of mountains in Taiwan
Geography of Taiwan
Geology of Taiwan

References

External links

The Volcanic Activity & Igneous Rock in Taiwan

 
Taiwan
Volcanoes
Volcanoes